John Wick is an American comic book limited series written by Greg Pak and drawn by Giovanni Valletta (issues 1–2) and Matt Gaudio (issues 3–5). Published by Dynamite Entertainment, the series is a prequel to the neo-noir action thriller media franchise of the same name created by Derek Kolstad and starring Keanu Reeves as John Wick, with the comic book using Reeves' likeness for the character. The series chronicles a young John Wick after his release from prison and his first vendetta. The series, originally published between November 2017 and January 2018, was published as a graphic novel in June 16, 2020.

Premise 
When a young John Wick emerges from prison and embarks upon his first, epic vendetta, he comes up against a strange, powerful community of assassins and must learn how to master the Book of Rules that guides their lethal business.

Characters 

 Jardani "Johnny" Jovanovich / John Wick – A freelancer assassin embarking on a vendetta for the murder of his village twelve years earlier.
 Charon – A concierge at the Continental Hotel sought out by the Three Bills.
 Maria – An Adjudicator of the High Table interested in acquiring Wick's service.
 The Three Bills – Peco, Buffalo, and Billy, a trio of assassins formerly associated with Wick.
 Calamity – The Three Bills' insane former bazooka-wielding enforcer and the true target of Wick's vendetta.

Reception

References

Comics by Greg Pak
Dynamite Entertainment titles
John Wick